Gang of Ghosts is a 2014 Hindi horror comedy film, produced by Venus Records & Tapes Pvt Ltd and The Satish Kaushik Entertainment. Directed by Satish Kaushik, it is a remake of Bengali film Bhooter Bhabishyat (Future of The Ghosts).

Plot
A story about a group of ghosts who have lost their shelter due to urbanization.  The story that the stranger narrates shows the communal, social, linguistic and historical differences among the ghosts, as they belong to different eras.

It starts with a struggling wannabe film director entering the Royal Mansion in the motive of shooting for a movie of title "Hot Haryanvi" for which he can't decide about the ending. There a stranger comes past the guard to meet the director claiming that he is a writer and has a wonderful story worth making a movie. But, the director brushes him off. The writer Raju again confronts the director in order to make him listen to his story. The director finally agrees but on a condition that the writer will have to listen to his story first.

Raju writer listens to his story but doesn't like it and tells him to throw his story into a dustbin. The director then listens to Raju writer's story. He starts his story by saying about the relation of Mumbai's social and industrial works with the spirits or ghosts staying in the houses, trees, etc., and how their homes are lost. Then he shifts to Raibahadur Seth Gendamal Hemraj who owns a large Mill and is also the owner of the Royal Mansion. The mill workers angry by Gendamal's friendly relation with the Britishers, set out to burn the mill in which Gendamal was present, burning him to death. His ghost now stays at his own Royal Mansion. Then Raju tells about Mr. Ramsey who was had a habit of reading and at that time the Indians were struggling for the fight for Independence and threw a bomb at him to his death. He contacted his once upon a time boss Mr. Booth who asks Gendamal to let Ramsey stay at the Royal Mansion to which Gendamal agrees.

Raju then tells the director that Gendamal had a younger brother Gulab Chand (Chunkey Pandey) who was dating a famous actress at that time Manoranjana Kumari (Mahi Gill). She wanted Gulab to marry her and he also agrees with to soon marry each other. But Gulab betrays her by marrying a rich girl. So she gets depresses and drinks a lot due to which she hangs herself and dies. Gendamal allows her to stay at the Royal Mansion. Gulab also dies after being shot by gangsters but Gendamal denies his request to stay at the mansion. Soon Gendamal and Ramsey conduct an audition for eligible ghosts in search of shelter. They select only 10 to 15 ghosts as the Mansion would be overcrowded. All live happily in the Royal Mansion with each other with some ghosts flirting with Manoranjana and others doing their own works.

Until one day, they come to know that a businessman named Mr. Bhuteria is planning to demolish the Mansion to build a grand mall in its place. The ghosts plan together to not let him achieve his goal. Manoranjana goes to Bhuteria by another  name to pull out some information from Bhuteria where he tells her of his wife Lakshmi (Pretie Lad) who died and still haunts him in his dreams.

He then reveals to Manoranjana that he actually killed her. Bhuteria turns to find Manoranjana  is not there. A ghost named Babu Hatkata goes to Bhuteria to tell him that he knows of his plots and invites him to the Royal Mansion to speak with Gendamal. There he enjoys a party organised by the ghosts and learns that one of the dancers is his Lakshmi and they reveal that they are all ghosts and Gendamal also tells him that if he makes a mall then they will be homeless and tells him to get out of the mansion.

Bhuteria returns to the mansion and returns the original documents of the mansion and never comes back again.

The story ends here where in the present, the director wonders if he has the resources and finance to make the movie. Raju goes back to the store room and comes back with a pouch of gold coins from the time of the East India Company and their value would be enough to make the film. There Raju tells the director that while being he couldn't do anything but after dying he was able to get acknowledgement, which explains that the director was talking to a ghost all the time. He explain that while he was in his struggling days he once came across a bus where some men are about to rape a girl. He rushes to save her during which he gets stabbed to his death. He brushes it off until Raju shows him all the ghosts in another room. He wakes up from a dream stating that this was a dream. He meets his crew searching for him and tells that he listened a full script in his dream. He goes back to the room to find Raju's bag which is full of cash and also the pouch of  gold coins earlier in his pocket and gets spooked. Inspired by the story, he starts the movie with Raju's story with all the ghosts looking at the shoot with great happiness.

Cast
The full cast includes—

Sharman Joshi as Raju Writer
Parambrata Chatterjee as Director
Mansee Deshmukh as Tania (AD)
Sangeetha Khonayat as Heroine
Mahi Gill as Manoranjana Kumari
Anupam Kher as Raibahadur Seth Gendamal Hemraj
Asrani as Atmaram
Meera Chopra as Tina Chopra
J. Brandon Hill as Mr. Ramsey
Rajesh Khattar as Bhuteria
Pretie Lad as Lakshmi (wife of Bhuteria)
Saurabh Shukla as Bhoothnath Bhaduri
Rajpal Yadav as Akbar Khwaja Khan
Yashpal Sharma as Brigadier Hoshiar Singh
Vijay Varma as Robin Hoodda
Chunky Pandey as Gulab Chand
Jackie Shroff as Babu Hatkata
Lankesh Bhardwaj as Salim Fatela

Guest Appearances
Paoli Dam (Item Number)
Aniruddh Dave
Sonal Tanna
Amit Pathak
Jeetendra Bhora
Amit Pathak
Jitendra Bohra
Pradeep Nagar
Sharad Ponkshe
Anil Saxena
Aloke Sengupta 
Chintan Takkar 
Vibhuti Jaiswal 
Rutwij Vaidya
Jack dhaliwal
Ankur Malhotra

Soundtrack
The film's soundtrack was composed by Dharam Sandeep, while lyrics were by Satish Kaushik, Vikas Kumar, Qateel Shifai and Rashmi Singh.

"Dasni Sharab Di" - Aamir Ghulam Ali, Malkoo, AK the Punjabi Rapper, Deepali Sathe shot on Paoli Dam
"Ishq Behn Ka Dinna" - Vikas Kumar, Vishvesh Parmar
"Jaayen To Jaayen Kahan" - Manoj Mishra
"Naach Madhubala" - Aishwarya Nigam 
"Nahin Dungi" - Rupmatii Jolly
"Parody" - Sudesh Bhosle, Aishwarya Nigam, Manoj Mishra, Abhishek Nailwal, Aditi Paul
"Machis Ki Tilli" - Malini Banerjee, Jonita Gandhi, Aishwarya Nigam, Sandeep Patil shot on Mahi Gill, Meera Chopra, Pretie Lad
"Sheeshe Ka Dil" - Rupmatii Jolly

Shooting
70% of the shooting of the film took place in Surat, Gujarat Local Line Producer, Surat
Amit Thakkar, Ashvin Borad,Ganesh Vaghani.

References

External links
 
 
 

2014 films
Hindi remakes of Bengali films
2010s Hindi-language films
2010s comedy horror films
Indian haunted house films
Indian comedy horror films
Indian ghost films
Indian horror film remakes
Indian films with live action and animation
Films directed by Satish Kaushik
Films set in country houses
2014 comedy films